Eupododexia is a genus of parasitic flies in the family Tachinidae.

Species
Eupododexia amoena Mesnil, 1976
Eupododexia diaphana Villeneuve, 1915
Eupododexia festiva Villeneuve, 1915
Eupododexia gigantea Mesnil, 1976
Eupododexia picta Mesnil, 1976

References

Dexiinae
Diptera of Africa
Tachinidae genera
Taxa named by Joseph Villeneuve de Janti